Kim Han-min (born November 5, 1969) is a South Korean film director and screenwriter. He directed the feature films Paradise Murdered (2007), Handphone (2009), War of the Arrows (2011), and The Admiral: Roaring Currents (2014).

Career
After graduating from Dongguk University's Graduate School of Film Arts, Kim Han-min gained accolades for two of his short films - Sunflower Blues which screened at the Puchon International Fantastic Film Festival as well as the New York Independent Film Festival; and Three Hungry Brothers which received awards at the Mise-en-scene Genre Film Festival, the Asiana International Short Film Festival, and the Seoul Digital Film Festival.

In 2007 he made his feature directorial debut with the mystery-thriller Paradise Murdered starring Park Hae-il, Park Sol-mi and Sung Ji-ru. A fictionalized account of a murder that took place on a secluded island in the 1980s involving rational and irrational horrors, the film sold over 2 million tickets nationwide. In his second feature, Kim shifted his setting to the big city, with blackmail thriller Handphone (2009) revolving around every urbanite's essential hardware, the cell phone. Starring Uhm Tae-woong and Park Yong-woo, it fell short of both the commercial and critical successes of his first film.

Set during the second Manchu invasion of 1636, Kim's third film War of the Arrows (2011) combined well-choreographed combat sequences and special effects, fast pacing, a tense plot and the thrill of the chase to tell the story of a master archer and his quest to rescue his sister from Qing Dynasty soldiers. The period action film unexpectedly drew an audience of 7.46 million, making it the highest grossing Korean film of 2011. It also won recognition at the Grand Bell Awards and the Blue Dragon Film Awards, notably for its lead actors Park Hae-il, Ryu Seung-ryong and Moon Chae-won.

Kim's follow-up in 2014 was another period epic, Battle of Myeongryang, Whirlwind Sea (released internationally as The Admiral: Roaring Currents), which depicted the legendary sea battle between 12 vessels of the Korean navy led by the most admired military figure in Korea, General Yi Sun-sin (played by Choi Min-sik), and 330 invading Japanese ships, which are eventually defeated. Given the disparity in numbers, the battle is regarded as one of Yi's most remarkable victories.

To commemorate Yi's 407th birth anniversary in 2015, Kim and Jung Se-kyu co-directed Roaring Currents: The Road of the Admiral, a documentary prequel to The Admiral: Roaring Currents in which cast members of the 2014 film retraced the 450-kilometer path that the admiral walked in preparation for the Battle of Myeongnyang, based on the war diary that Yi wrote.

Beginning with 2014 film, The Admiral: Roaring Currents, Kim created Yi Sun-sin trilogy, based on three major naval battles led by Admiral Yi Sun-sin. The second film Hansan: Rising Dragon, based on Battle of Hansan Island which took place 5 years before Battle of Myeongnyang depicted in The Admiral, was released in 2022. Park Hae-il portrayed Admiral Yi in the film.

Filmography

Feature films

Film 
 Hansan Redux (2022) – Kwon Yul

Short films
A Painter Story (short film, 1995) – director
Beyond... (short film, 1995) – director
Sympathy (short film, 1997) – director
Rush (short film, 1998) – director
Sunflower Blues (short film, 1999) – director, screenwriter, editor
Three Hungry Brothers (short film, 2003) – director, screenwriter, editor
A Wintering (2007) – actor

Awards
2007 28th Blue Dragon Film Awards: Best New Director; Best Screenplay (Paradise Murdered)
2014 51st Grand Bell Awards: Best Planning (The Admiral: Roaring Currents)
2014 35th Blue Dragon Film Awards: Best Director (The Admiral: Roaring Currents)
2022 31st Buil Film Awards: Best Director (Hansan: Rising Dragon)

References

External links
 
 
 

South Korean film directors
South Korean screenwriters
Dongguk University alumni
Living people
1969 births